This article show all participating team squads at the 2012 FIVB World Grand Prix, played by sixteen countries with the final round held in Ningbo, China.

The following is the Argentina roster in the 2012 FIVB World Grand Prix.

The following is the Brazil roster in the 2012 FIVB World Grand Prix.

The following is the China roster in the 2012 FIVB World Grand Prix.

The following is the Chinese Taipei roster in the 2012 FIVB World Grand Prix.

The following is the Cuba roster in the 2012 FIVB World Grand Prix.

The following is the Dominican Republic roster in the 2012 FIVB World Grand Prix.

The following is the Germany roster in the 2012 FIVB World Grand Prix.

The following is the Italy roster in the 2012 FIVB World Grand Prix.

The following is the Japan roster in the 2012 FIVB World Grand Prix.

The following is the South Korea roster in the 2012 FIVB World Grand Prix.

The following is the Poland roster in the 2012 FIVB World Grand Prix.

The following is the Puerto Rico roster in the 2012 FIVB World Grand Prix.

The following is the Serbia roster in the 2012 FIVB World Grand Prix.

The following is the Thailand roster in the 2012 FIVB World Grand Prix.

The following is the Turkey roster in the 2012 FIVB World Grand Prix.

The following is the United States roster in the 2012 FIVB World Grand Prix.

References

External links
FIVB

2012
2012 in volleyball